David Plowden (born October 9, 1932), is an American photographer who has made historical documentary photography of urban cities, steam trains, American farmlands, and small towns.

Plowden has produced 20 books and his work is held in the permanent collections of the Smithsonian Institution and the Library of Congress. He was awarded a Guggenheim Fellowship in 1968.

Life and work
Plowden graduated from Yale College in 1955. After working for the Great Northern Railway in 1959, he studied under Minor White and Nathan Lyons, and was an assistant to O. Winston Link and George Meluso. He has held various teaching positions at Illinois Institute of Technology – Institute of Design, University of Iowa - School of Journalism, University of Baltimore, and Grand Valley State University.

In 1995, Plowden agreed to transfer the entire archive of his notes, negatives and prints to the Beinecke Rare Book and Manuscript Library at Yale University at the end of his career.

In 2017, the Milwaukee School of Engineering Grohmann Museum exhibited his Steel: The Cycle of Industry collection and repackaged a photo book of the same name, which chronicles steel from its start as taconite pellet mines in Minnesota to the blast furnaces of Gary, Indiana, and from its shipment across the Great Lakes to the demise of the mills in places like Lackawanna, NY.

Plowden's photographs are characterized by their stark detail. In the steel mill photos, he attributed this to shots he would overexpose and under develop. On his subject matter — steam engines, small town Main Streets, steel mills — Plowden said: "I have always felt that I have been standing in the middle ground between two eras, with one eye on the 19th century and the other on the 21st ... all across America we have left abandoned, like carcasses after the feast, that which only yesterday was state-of-the-art invention."

In July 1977, he married Sandra (née Schoellkopf). He lives in Winnetka, Illinois.

Publications

Publications with photographs and text by Plowden
Farewell to Steam. Stephen Greene Press, 1966.
Bonanza Edition, 1968.
Lincoln and His America. Viking, 1970.
Book-of-the-Month Club, 1971. Alternate selection. Received the Benjamin Barondess Award, 1971.
The Hand of Man on America. Smithsonian, 1971.
Paperback edition. Chatham, 1973.
Second printing. 1974.
Floor of the Sky: The Great Plains. Sierra Club, 1972.
Commonplace. E. P. Dutton, 1974.
Bridges: The Spans of North America. Viking, 1974.
Macmillan Book Club, 1975. Alternate selection.
Reprinted edition, hardcover, New York City: W. W. Norton, 1984.
Reprinted edition, paperback, New York City: W. W. Norton, 1988.
Tugboat. Macmillan, 1976. Received the American Library Association Notable Children's Books 1976.
Steel. Viking, 1981.
An American Chronology. Viking, 1982. With an introduction by David G. McCullough,
Industrial Landscape. New York City: W. W. Norton, 1985,
A Time of Trains. New York City: W. W. Norton, 1987,
A Sense of Place. New York City: W. W. Norton, 1988,
End of an Era: The Last of the Great Lakes Steamboats. New York City: W. W. Norton, 1992,
Small Town America. Harry N. Abrams, 1994. With an introduction by David G. McCullough,
Imprints: A Retrospective. Bulfinch, 1997. With an introduction by Alan Trachtenberg.
Bridges: the Spans of North America. Revised Edition. New York City: W. W. Norton, 2002.
David Plowden: The American Barn. New York City: W. W. Norton, 2003.
A Handful of Dust: Disappearing America. New York City: W. W. Norton, 2006.
David Plowden: Vanishing Point: Fifty Years of Photography. New York City: W. W. Norton, 2007. With an introduction by Steve Edwards.
Requiem for Steam: The Railroad Photographs of David Plowden. New York City: W. W. Norton, 2010.
David Plowden’s Iowa. Humanities Iowa, 2012.
Heartland: The Plains and The Prairie. New York City: W.W. Norton, 2013.

Publications solely containing photographs by Plowden
The Freeway in the City. U.S. Government Printing Office, 1968.
Wayne County: The Aesthetic Heritage of a Rural Area. Publishing Center for Cultural Resources, 1979. Commissioned by New York State Council for the Arts.
The States and the Nations. New York City: W. W. Norton and the American Association for State and Local History, 1977–1981. New Jersey, New York, North Dakota, South Dakota, and Vermont editions.
A Place of Sense. University of Iowa, 1988.

Publications with photographs by Plowden and text co-authored with another
Gems. Viking Press, 1967.
America the Vanishing. Stephen Greene Press, 1969.
Nantucket. Viking Press, 1970. Text by Plowden and Patricia Coffin.
Cape May to Montauk. Viking Press, 1973. Text by Plowden and Nelson P. Falorp.
Desert and Plain, the Mountains and the River. E.P. Dutton, 1975. Text by Plowden and Berton Roueché.
The Iron Road. Four Winds Press, 1978. Text by Plowden and with Richard Snow.

Award
1968: Guggenheim Fellowship from the John Simon Guggenheim Memorial Foundation

Collections
Plowden's work is held in the following permanent collections:
Smithsonian Institution, Washington, D.C.
Library of Congress, Washington, D.C.

References

External links

David Plowden Photographs and Papers. Yale Collection of Western Americana, Beinecke Rare Book and Manuscript Library.

1932 births
Living people
American photographers
Grand Valley State University faculty
Yale College alumni